The 1985 Southeast Asian Games, officially known as the 13th Southeast Asian Games, was a Southeast Asian multi-sport event held in Bangkok, Thailand from 8 to 17 December 1985.

This was the fourth time Thailand hosted the games and its first time since 1975. The country had previously hosted the 1959, 1967 and the 1975 editions, at the time when the games were then known as the Southeast Asian Peninsular (SEAP) Games. The games was opened and closed by Bhumibol Adulyadej, the King of Thailand at the Suphachalasai Stadium.

The final medal tally was led by hosts Thailand, followed by Indonesia and the Philippines. Several Games and National records were broken during the games. With little or no controversies at all, the games were deemed generally successful with the rising standard of competition amongst the Southeast Asian nations.

Organization

Development and preparation
The Bangkok SEA Games Organising Committee was formed to oversee the staging of the games.

Venues

Marketing

Logo
The logo of the 1985 SEA Games is the Grand Palace, one of the most popular tourist attractions in Thailand.

Mascot
The official 1985 SEA Games mascot was a Siamese cat.
The Siamese is one of the first distinctly recognised breeds of Oriental cat. It is called Wichien-maat in Thailand.

The games

Participating nations

Sports

Medal table
Key

References

 Percy Seneviratne (1993) Golden Moments: the S.E.A Games 1959-1991 Dominie Press, Singapore 
 History of the SEA Games
 BASOC (1985) 13th SEA Games Official Report, Thailand

 
Southeast Asian Games
Southeast Asian Games
Southeast Asian Games
Southeast Asian Games
Southeast Asian Games in Thailand
Southeast Asian Games by year
Southeast Asian Games